Akshita Mudgal is an Indian actress well known for her role of Ishqi in Sony TV popular show Ishk Par Zor Nahi.

Early life
Akshita Mudgal was born on July 9, 2002 in Agra, Uttar Pradesh. She is a professional dancer.

Career
At the age of 10, Akshita came to Mumbai from her hometown Agra and took part in DID Li'l Masters Season 2. After that, she started getting offers in acting and thus, she did her debut on television with Crime Patrol and appeared in more than 50 episodes. Then in 2014, she appeared in a Kannada Film Ugramm. Later, she went ahead to play a role in the 2015 Bindass TV show Zindagi Wins. She also starred as a child artist in the 2015 Emraan Hashmi starrer film Mr. X and Akshay Kumar starrer film Brothers.

Then she played various supportive characters like one of the cousins in the 2017 Sony TV show Yeh Moh Moh Ke Dhaagey, 2017 & TV show Half Marriage and 2018 & TV show Mitegi Laxman Rekha. In 2019, she first appeared as the parallel lead in SAB TV show Bhakharwadi opposite Akshay Kelkar. The show wrapped up in 2020 due to Covid-19 pandemic.

She then played the lead role of Ishqi Ahaan Malhotra in Sony TV's popular show Ishk Par Zor Nahi opposite Param Singh. Her chemistry with the actor was immensely praised & adored by admirers and critics equally. Their offscreen camaraderie is very much liked by their admirers who call the duo "Parakshita". Param and Akshita were awarded Best Actor (critics) and Best Actress (critics) respectively at Lions Gold Awards 2021. The show got wrapped up on 20 August 2021 due to creative differences between the production house and the channel. 
She then played the female lead for Zee TV show Iss Mod Se Jaate hain opposite Hitesh Bharadwaj. The show went off air on 20 April 2022 due to low ratings.

Filmography

Television

Films

References

External links

2002 births
Television actresses
Living people
People from Agra
People from Uttar Pradesh
Indian soap opera actresses
Indian women television presenters
Actresses in Hindi television
People from Mumbai
Indian television actresses
Indian film actresses
21st-century Indian actresses